Bilateral diplomatic relations between the United States and Portugal date from the earliest years of the United States. Following the Revolutionary War, Portugal was the first neutral country to recognize the United States. On February 21, 1791, President George Washington opened formal diplomatic relations, naming Col. David Humphreys as U.S. Minister Resident. Subsequent envoys were given the title Minister Plenipotentiary.

Chiefs of mission

Other nominees

Notes

See also
Portuguese Embassy, Washington, D.C.
Portugal – United States relations
Foreign relations of Portugal
Ambassadors of the United States

References
United States Department of State: Background notes on Portugal

External links
 United States Department of State: Chiefs of Mission for Portugal
 United States Department of State: Portugal
United States Embassy in Lisbon

Portugal
United States
Portugal–United States relations